The Slovakia national beach soccer team represents Slovakia in international beach soccer competitions and is controlled by the SFZ, the governing body for football in Slovakia.

Achievements 
 FIFA Beach Soccer World Cup qualification (UEFA) Best: Group stage
 2008, 2011, 2015

External links 
 Team's profile on Beach Soccer Worldwide
 Team's profile on Beach Soccer Russia

Beach Soccer
European national beach soccer teams